Following the 2009 presidential election in Iran, various Marjas (a religious authority for which the title Grand Ayatollah is given)  have made statements concerning the controversies surrounding the election.

Table of Marjas and their published stance

This table was taken directly from the List of marjas, with some columns removed and a new one added.

The names are ordered alphabetically.

Changes in position

Ali Hosseini Khamenei initially confirmed the election, but later ordered a probe.

Official statements

Several Marjas have made official statements about the controversies surrounding the 2009 Iranian presidential election.  In addition to the statements made by the Marjas

Grand Ayatullah Husayn Hossein Ali Montazeri

(Translated, from his official website)In the name of GodPeople of IranThese last days, we have witnessed the lively efforts of you brothers and sisters, old and young alike, from any social category, for the 10th presidential elections.Our youth, hoping to see their rightful will fulfilled, came on the scene and waited patiently. This was the greatest occasion for the government's officials to bond with their people.But unfortunately, they used it in the worst way possible. Declaring results that no one in their right mind can believe, and despite all the evidence of crafted results, and to counter people protestations, in front of the eyes of the same nation who carried the weight of a revolution and 8 years of war, in front of the eyes of local and foreign reporters, attacked the children of the people with astonishing violence. And now they are attempting a purge, arresting intellectuals, political opponents and Scientifics.Now, based on my religious duties, I will remind you:1- A legitimate state must respect all points of view. It may not oppress all critical views. I fear that this leads to the loss of people's faith in Islam.2- Given the current circumstances, I expect the government to take all measures to restore people's confidence. Otherwise, as I have already said, a government not respecting people's vote has no religious or political legitimacy.3- I invite everyone, specially the youth, to continue reclaiming their dues in calm, and not let those who want to associate this movement with chaos succeed.4- I ask the police and army personals not to "sell their religion", and beware that receiving orders will not excuse them before god. Recognize the protesting youth as your children. Today censor and cutting telecommunication lines can not hide the truth.I pray for the greatness of the Iranian people.''

Statements from other Ayatollahs

While not Marjas themselves, several influential Ayatollahs have made statements regarding the 2009 Iranian elections.

Grand Ayatollah Yousef Sanei and Grand Ayatollah Asadollah Bayat Zanjani wrote letters to the Iranian news web site Emrooz in support of the protestors, with Ayatollah Zanjani referring to the election as a "gross injustice,"

References 

2009 in Iran
2009 Iranian presidential election